Lisa-Marié Deetlefs (born 8 September 1987) is a South African field hockey player for the South African national team.

International career
Lisa made her debut for South Africa in 2007 against Canada at Stellenbosch.

She competed in the 2008 and 2012 Summer Olympics, 2010 Commonwealth Games, 2014 Commonwealth Games, 2018 Commonwealth Games and 2022 Commonwealth Games.

Lisa Deetlefs announces retirement from International Hockey in 24 August 2021, reversed her decision to retire from International hockey, 2022 Women's FIH Hockey World Cup.

Personal life
Lisa-Marie Deetlefs currently holds a position as head of hockey at St. Andrew's School for Girls in Johannesburg.

Club

Madikwe Rangers 
2019 PHL Women - Player of the tournament

References

External links
 
 

1987 births
Living people
Alumni of St Mary's School, Waverley
South African female field hockey players
Olympic field hockey players of South Africa
Field hockey players at the 2008 Summer Olympics
Field hockey players at the 2012 Summer Olympics
Field hockey players at the 2020 Summer Olympics
Field hockey players at the 2014 Commonwealth Games
Field hockey players at the 2018 Commonwealth Games
Commonwealth Games competitors for South Africa
Field hockey players from Johannesburg
Female field hockey defenders
20th-century South African women
21st-century South African women
Field hockey players at the 2022 Commonwealth Games